Kinman Guitar Electrix is a boutique Australian company that specializes in the design and manufacture of innovative Zero-Hum (hum-canceling) pickups for electric guitars that solve noise problems associated with single coil pickups 

One of its most popular products is the Kinman Hx (an initialism for Hum cancelling) pickup, a patented noiseless pickup design developed in 1996 by its founder, Chris Kinman, as a direct drop-in replacement for Fender Stratocaster style single coil pickups. Most of the models in the Kinman line carry the designation AVn, an initialism for Authentic Vintage noiseless (although Kinman himself prefers the term Zero-Hum since buzz from wiring is also noise and can only be prevented with shielding of wiring cavities in the guitar).

In 1998 Kinman embarked on development of technology specifically for Telecaster guitars that was not introduced until circa 2001. The technology centers around a patented laminated steel H-core bobbin that functions as a noise sensing coil. It is made of 150 separate pieces of steel. The H-core is interesting because it performs far more efficiently than conventional noise sensing bobbins using steel core pins, requiring less turns of copper wire to produce the required hum voltage. There is a strong correlation between sonic signature of a hum canceling pickup and the number of turns and diameter of copper wire contained in the hum sensor.

Circa 2003 Kinman introduced a line of No-Soldering Harness for Stratocasters and Telecasters that allow guitar players to install pickups and harness into their instruments without the need for soldering, which is the usual method. Some models incorporate a switching system that provides 9 different sounds by connecting various pickups in series as well as parallel and combinations thereof.

In October 2009, after an inventive development period of almost 9 years, Kinman released a hum-canceling P-90 pickup known as the P-90 Hx. It incorporates new 'patent applied for' magnetic circuit technology which allows a minimal 600 Ohm noise sensor. Kinman claims this new noise sensor technology is responsible for unusually accurate reproduction of P-90 sound. The P-90 Hx is also remarkable for its 202 individual components including 2 Alnico bar magnets, a normal P-90 has about 12 components making the P-90 Hx the most complex and sophisticated guitar pickup yet.

Kinmans new 'patent applied for' technology concerning their 600 Ohm noise sensor has given rise to a new breed of hum-canceling pickups for Stratocaster and Telecaster also with 600 Ohm noise sensors. These new models are remarkable because the 600 Ohm noise sensor allows the pickups to generate accurate sonic reproduction of the original sound of Stratocaster and Telecaster pickups despite being hum-canceling which hitherto has been impossible to achieve.

The Impersonator 54 Strat pickup incorporating H-core technology introduced circa 2010 has received wide acclaim for its authentic reproduction of the sound of Fender's CS-54 noisy single coil. Hank Marvin preferred the CS54 to achieve his 1960s Shadows lead guitar sound and Kinman's Impersonator 54 was created at Hanks request for a noiseless version of the C-54. The CS-54 is used extensively for all kinds of musical environments.

Kinman holds the most number of patents concerned with increasing the efficiency of and minimizing the noise sensing coils in hum-canceling guitar pickups.

Circa mid-2011 the company released a range of innovative Gibson style Humbuckers. Somewhat of a departure from single coils Kinman applied technology derived from their single coils to improve the sound of the conventional humbucker. Kinman claims to improve articulation, clarity, transparency of the low wound strings and touch sensitivity of the iconic humbucker. Kinman humbuckers also set a new benchmark for quietness where hum is concerned (most conventional humbucker construction is asymmetric to a degree thus the imbalance between the coils causes some hum).

One model, the P90-Bucker, sounds close to a P-90. It has a definite single coil vibe which has been along sought after goal which Gibson themselves sought to achieve when they designed their original PAF humbucking pickup. However, their PAF turned out to be a very different sounding pickup compared to a P-90.  The P90-Bucker delivers a very similar sound to a P-90 with Zero-Hum and is a direct replacement for existing humbuckers. The Twang Bucker produces 100% single coil sound with 0% Hum.

Around April 2013 Kinman released a Zero-Hum pickup for Fender's Jazzmaster guitar, the very first Zero-Hum pickup for Jazzmaster. Its advanced technology and its 600 Ohm hum sensor was cunningly designed so that the entire pickup fits inside a Fender Jazzmaster cover and no routing of the pickup cavity is necessary. That was a challenging problem since pickup cavities in the Jazzmaster are quite shallow compared to those in Stratocasters and Telecasters. The 600 Ohm hum sensor also allows exceptional high frequency response and dynamic range which is a hallmark of Kinman pickups. These Jazzmaster pickups are available in several models (FatMaster, a bigger version of thin original sound; ThickMaster, a thick and syrupy sound not unlike Charlie Christian's sound; SurfMaster, a highly dynamic sound in the sonic ilk of Dick Dale)

Coinciding with the launch of Kinman's new website is the releases of Zero-Hum Gold Foil, 580 Alnico Staple, Jaguar and Mustang pickups as well as their new KHP-90 Goodbye-Soldering Harness for 1 and 2 pickup guitars in the ilk of Gibson and PRS.

5-Oct-20 Kinman announced, after a 2 year development period, the release of their Magnum Opus '59 pickup for Stratocaster. They claim it produces authentic 1950's Stratocaster sound, the first one that has Zero-Hum (noiseless).  It was developed at the request of Hank Marvin, the legendary lead guitarist for the Shadows (UK) and has received acclaim from Hank Marvins inner circle. Paul Rossiter of TVS echo unit fame and one of Hank Marvins inner circle along with Gary Taylor of UB Hank backing tracks fame, recorded the Shadows tune Dance On with the Magnum Opus '59, it speaks for itself.

Patents
Chris Kinman has been awarded the following US patents:

 USA Patent Number 5,668,520 issued 1997
 USA Patent Number 5,834,999 issued 1998
 USA Patent Number 6,103,966 issued 2000
 USA Patent Number 29/240,940 issued 2006
 USA Patent Number 7,022,909 issued 2006
 USA Patent Number 8,791,351 issued 2010

External links
 Kinman website
 sound clips of Kinman pickups for Telecaster

Guitar pickup manufacturers